Chevaline is a commune in the southeastern French department of Haute-Savoie.

See also
Communes of the Haute-Savoie department
Annecy shootings

References

Communes of Haute-Savoie